Amaxia flavicollis is a moth of the subfamily Arctiinae. It was described by Rothschild in 1909. It is found in French Guiana, the upper Amazon basin, Venezuela, Ecuador and Brazil.

References

Moths described in 1909
Amaxia
Moths of South America